Bob Crowley is an American private equity investor, software executive and athlete.

During his early career (1980-2003) he was an entrepreneur in the cable television and software sectors with American Cablesystems, CableData, Kenan Systems, Arbortext and Bowstreet; all of which were sold to Fortune 500 companies.

in 2003 he co-founded The Mustang Group in Boston, a private equity firm investing in small and medium-sized private companies which included Cascade Lacrosse, Vermont Teddy Bear, Scribe Software and Renovation Brands.

As an athlete Bob has completed more than 200 ultra-distance events including Western States 100 Mile Endurance Run, Hardrock 100, Tahoe 200, Moab 240 and Tor des Geants.

In 2020 he was elected president of the International Trail Running Association (ITRA), a Swiss-based non-profit responsible for the global trail running community of approximately 2 million. Bob also led one of the largest trail running clubs in the world, Trail Animals Running Club (TARC) for decades.

He has been frequent speaker at technology and communications industry forums as well as appeared on numerous business and technology media outlets (CNN, MSNBC, Wall Street Journal, New York Times, etc.).

He has received numerous awards including: Entrepreneur of the Year, Young President's Award, Information Week Top 10 Executive, Red Herring's Top 100 Technology Leaders, Info World's Rainmaker and Who's Who in American Universities.

He currently mentors numerous entrepreneurs, founders and CEOs of for-profit and non-profits .

References

External links
The Mustang Group
Safeguard Scientific

American financial businesspeople
People from Scarsdale, New York
Private equity and venture capital investors
Living people
Year of birth missing (living people)